Marquarius Malik White (born May 5, 2004) is an American football wide receiver for the Tennessee Volunteers.

High school career
White earned the nickname "squirrel" from his grandmother as an infant. He attended Clay-Chalkville High School in Clay, Alabama. As a senior, he had 49 receptions for 1,162 yards and 16 touchdowns. White committed to the University of Tennessee to play college football. White also ran track in high school.

College career
As a true freshman at Tennessee, White played in 12 games and had 30 receptions for 481 yards with two touchdowns.

References

External links
Tennessee Volunteers bio

2004 births
Living people
Players of American football from Alabama
American football wide receivers
Tennessee Volunteers football players